Omni Park is a large shopping centre and retail park in the Republic of Ireland. Located in Santry, in the north of Dublin close to the M50 motorway. Omni Park also features a selection of eateries, an Oratory and an 11 screen cinema called IMC (formerly called Omniplex). The centre has surface and multi-storey car parking.

In 2005, additional development was undertaken with the construction of a multi-storey car park and a new mall which included an office suite on the third floor. Jack & Jones, Vero Moda, H&M, New Look, Elvery's, Lifestyle Sports, Name It, and Easons all occupied space in the new mall, with a number of vacant units waiting for retail tenants on the upper mall. A new boardwalk/retail park was also constructed with outlets including Boots, Starbucks, Argos, and Peacocks.

Omni Park's three main anchors are Penneys, Tesco Ireland and New Look. Other retailers include Dealz, Argos Extra and Boots which opened in 2009.

Since 2012, Omni Park Shopping Centre is home to the Santry post office which relocated from nearby Santry Avenue.

In 2014, Lidl completed the construction of their unit within the Omni Park Shopping Centre. The construction of the Lidl store provided an additional 150 car parking spaces. As part of the planning permission for the Lidl unit, three further retail units received planning.

References

External links 
 Omni Park

Shopping centres in County Dublin
Buildings and structures in Dublin (city)